In Greek mythology, Leipephilene (Ancient Greek: Λειπεφιλήνη) was the daughter of Iolaus and Megara. She was renowned for her beauty which was compared to that of an Olympian goddess. Leipephilene married Phylas and bore two children to him, Hippotes and Thero.

The name form "Leipephilene" is a corruption, and has been variously emended by some editors as "Leipephile" (Λειπεφίλη), "Hippophile" (Ἱπποφίλη) or "Deiphile" (Δηιφίλη). The precise original form remains unknown.

Notes

Women in Greek mythology

References 

 Pausanias, Description of Greece with an English Translation by W.H.S. Jones, Litt.D., and H.A. Ormerod, M.A., in 4 Volumes. Cambridge, MA, Harvard University Press; London, William Heinemann Ltd. 1918. . Online version at the Perseus Digital Library
 Pausanias, Graeciae Descriptio. 3 vols. Leipzig, Teubner. 1903.  Greek text available at the Perseus Digital Library.

Characters in Greek mythology